Elections were held in Wellington County, Ontario on October 27, 2014 in conjunction with municipal elections across the province.

Wellington County Council
The council consists of the seven mayors of the constituent municipalities plus nine councillors elected from county wards.

Centre Wellington

Erin

Guelph/Eramosa

Mapleton

Minto

Puslinch

Wellington North

See also
 2010 Wellington County municipal elections

References

Wellington
Wellington County, Ontario